Grabnik may refer to the following places:
Grabnik, Gmina Adamów in Lublin Voivodeship (east Poland)
Grabnik, Gmina Krasnobród in Lublin Voivodeship (east Poland)
Grabnik, Podlaskie Voivodeship (north-east Poland)
Grabnik, Grodzisk Mazowiecki County in Masovian Voivodeship (east-central Poland)
Grabnik, Ostrołęka County in Masovian Voivodeship (east-central Poland)
Grabnik, Warsaw West County in Masovian Voivodeship (east-central Poland)
Grabnik, Ełk County in Warmian-Masurian Voivodeship (north Poland)
Grabnik, Mrągowo County in Warmian-Masurian Voivodeship (north Poland)